Pierre-Thomas-Nicolas Hurtaut (17 April 1719 – 5 May 1791) was an 18th-century French historian and writer.

Short biographie 
The son of a horse trader, Pierre-Thomas-Nicolas Hurtaut became Latin teacher at the École Militaire and published his first book, Le Voyage d'Aniers in 1748. Interested in the mysteries of the human body, he devoted several books to the topic, including L'Art de péter and Essai de médecine sur le flux menstruel in which he pastiched medicinal treaties. He was also a historian and a member of the Société du bout du banc.

Bibliography 
1748: Le Voyage d'Aniers
1750: Coup d’œil anglais sur les cérémonies du mariage
1751: L'Art de péter
1754: Essai de médecine sur le flux menstruel
1770: Le Pacte du destin
1774: Iconologie historique des souverains d'Europe
1775: Abrégé historique et portatif des rois mérovingiens
1775: Dictionnaire des mots homonymes de la langue française
1779: Dictionnaire historique de la ville de Paris et de ses environs, (in collaboration with Magny).

18th-century French male writers
18th-century French historians
French lexicographers
1719 births
Writers from Paris
1791 deaths
18th-century lexicographers